The Shanghai–Kunming Expressway, designated as G60 and commonly referred to as the Hukun Expressway is an expressway that connects the cities of Shanghai, China, and Kunming, Yunnan. The entire route forms part of Asian Highway 3.

Route
The Shanghai portion of the Shanghai–Kunming Expressway was originally designated A8 by the municipal government and was also known as the Shanghai–Hangzhou Expressway. In Shanghai, the Shanghai–Kunming Expressway is a concurrency for its entire length with G92 Hangzhou Bay Ring Expressway.

The Zhejiang portion of the expressway runs from the Shanghai border to the Jiangxi border, passing through the cities of Hangzhou, Jinhua, and Quzhou.

The Jiangxi portion of the expressway passes through the cities of Shangrao, Nanchang, Yichun, and Pingxiang.

The Hunan section of the expressway passes through the cities of Zhuzhou, Shaoyang, and Huaihua.

The portion of the expressway connecting Sansui County and Kaili City is known as the Sankai Expressway. The Kaima Expressway connects Kaili City to Majiang County.

The portion of the expressway connecting Guiyang City and Zhenning County is known as the Qingzhen Expressway.

In Yunnan Province, the expressway passes through the city of Qujing before terminating in Kunming.

Gallery

References

Chinese national-level expressways
Expressways in Shanghai
Expressways in Zhejiang
Expressways in Jiangxi
Expressways in Hunan
Expressways in Guizhou
Expressways in Yunnan